The KLF Book Awards, founded in 2021, is a literary honor in India, presented and established by the Kalinga Literary Festival. The awards are given in various categories including fiction and non-fiction books, poetry, Hindi language books, books in translation, Bhasa first book, business and strategic affairs books, environmental books, biographical and autobiographical books, children books, sports, lifestyle and emerging trend books.

History
The KLF Book Awards was established in 2021 by the Kalinga Literary Festival. The awards for the years 2020-21 were announced in September 2021, and 47 authors were selected for the award.

The awards are given in various categories including fiction and non-fiction books, poetry, Hindi language books, books in translation, Bhasa first book, business and strategic affairs books, environmental books, biographical and autobiographical books, children books, sports, lifestyle and emerging trend books. The purpose of the award, according to festival director Rashmi Ranjan Parida, is "to contribute to debates and discourses in the national and global public sphere and encourage more thoughtful, reflective, unique and inspiring contributions".

The awards for 2020-21 will be awarded at Kalinga Literary Festival which is set to be held from 10 to 12 December 2021 in Bhubaneswar.

List of winners

2020-21

KLF Fiction Book of the Year Award
 Undertow, Jahnavi Barua
 Betrayed by Hope: A Play on the Life of Michael Madhusudan Dutt, Namita Gokhale and Malashri Lal
 The Begum and the Dastan, Tarana Husain Khan
 The Vault of Vishnu, Ashwin Sanghi
 Undercover in Bandipore, Ashok Kaul

KLF Non-fiction Book of the Year Award
 Princestan: How Nehru, Patel and Mountbatten Made India, Sandeep Bamzai
 The New World Disorder, Shashi Tharoor & Samir Saran
 Jugalbandi: The BJP Before Modi, Vinay Sitapati
 The Great Hindu Civilisation: Achievement, Neglect, Bias and the Way Forward, Pavan K Varma
 A Brief History of Mrdangam Makers, T M Krishna
 The Death Script, Ashutosh Bhardwaj
 Reporting India, Prem Prakash

KLF Poetry Book of the Year Award
 A Poem a Day, Gulzar
 Kalidasa: Meghduta-The Cloud Messenger & Kalidasa: Ritusamhara-The Six Seasons (Jointly), Abhay K.
 From Castleford to Kathmandu, Greta Rana
 Anek Pal aaur Mai, Basant Chaudhary

KLF Hindi Book of the Year Award
 Khela, Neelakshi Singh
 Kulbhooshan Ka Naam Darj Kijiye, Alka Saraogi
 Ravi Katha: Andaaz-E-Bayan Urf Ravi Katha, Mamta Kalia
 Wah Ustad, Praveen Kumar Jha
 Ek Desh Barah Duniya, Shirish Khare

KLF Book in Translation of the Year Award
 Estuary, Perumal Murugan, tr. Nandini Krishnan

KLF Bhasa Award
 The Runaway Boy, Manoranjan Byapari

KLF Debut Book Award
 I Am No Messiah, Sonu Sood and Meena Iyer

KLF Business Book of the Year Award
 Getting Competitive: A Practitioner’s Guide for India, R. C. Bhargava
 Overdraft, Urjit Patel
 Pandemonium: The Great Indian Banking Tragedy, Tamal Bandyopadhyay

KLF Diplomacy/Strategic Affairs Book of the Year Award
 The India Way: Strategies for an Uncertain World, S. Jaishankar
 Powershift: India-China Relations in a Multipolar World, Zorawar Daulet Singh
 Himalayan Challenge: India, China and the Quest for Peace, Subramanian Swamy

KLF Environmental Book of the Year Award
 Hari Bhari Ummid& The Chipko Movement: A People's History, Shekhar Pathak
 Jungle Nama, Amitav Ghosh

KLF Women/Dalit/Tribal/Minorities Literature Award
 Harijan: A Novel, Gopinath Mohanty (tr. Bikram Das)
 Makers of Modern Dalit History, Sudarshan Ramabadran and Guru Prakash Paswan
 A Plate of White Marble (Shwet Patharer Thala) by Bani Basu (tr. Nandini Guha)
 Ramvilas Paswan: Sankalp, Sahas aaur Sangharsh, Pradeep Srivastav
 Sir Syed Ahmad Khan: Reason, Religion and Nation, Shafey Kidwai

KLF Biography/Autobiography Book of the Year Award
 His Holiness the Fourteenth Dalai Lama: An Illustrated Biography, Tenzin Geyche Tethong
 Restless as Mercury: My Life as a Young Man Mohandas Karamchand Gandhi, Gopalkrishna Gandhi
 Akhtari: The Life and Music of Begum Akhtar, Yatindra Mishra
 Bharat Ke Pradhan Mantri, Rasheed Kidwai
 The House of Jaipur: The Inside Story of India’s Most Glamorous Royal Family, John Zubrzycki

KLF Children Book of the Year Award
 Miracle at Happy Bazaar: My Best Stories for Children, Ruskin Bond
 Grandparents' Bag of Stories, Sudha Murthy

KLF Sports Book of the Year Award
 The Commonwealth of Cricket, Ramachandra Guha

KLF Lifestyle and Emerging Trend Book Award
 Eating in the Age of Dieting, Rujuta Diwekar

References

Awards established in 2021
Indian literary awards